KIPT may refer to:

 KIPT (TV), a television station (channel 13 analog/22 digital) licensed to Twin Falls, Idaho, United States
 Williamsport Regional Airport, with ICAO code KIPT
 Kenya Institute of Puppet Theatre (KIPT), a puppetry organization, in Nairobi, Kenya